Troitsa is a rural locality (a selo) in Sylvenskoye Rural Settlement, Permsky District, Perm Krai, Russia. The population was 385 as of 2010. There are 49 streets.

Geography 
Troitsa is located 41 km east of Perm (the district's administrative centre) by road. Bulanki is the nearest rural locality.

References 

Rural localities in Permsky District
Populated places established in 1570